Benjamin Joyce Karr (November 28, 1893 – December 8, 1968), known as Benn Karr and nicknamed Baldy Karr, was a Major League Baseball pitcher who played between 1920 and 1927 for the  Boston Red Sox (1920–22) and Cleveland Indians (1925–27). He was born in Mount Pleasant, Mississippi.

In a six-season career, Karr posted a 35–48 record with 180 strikeouts and a 4.60 ERA in 177 appearances, including 58 starts, 29 complete games, one shutout, five saves, and 780⅓ innings of work. He also pitched in the minors for 15 years and served in the U.S. Army during World War I.

Karr died in Memphis, Tennessee at age 75.

External links
Baseball Reference

1893 births
1968 deaths
Boston Red Sox players
Cleveland Indians players
Major League Baseball pitchers
United States Army personnel of World War I
Baseball players from Mississippi
Minor league baseball managers
Memphis Chickasaws players
Mobile Sea Gulls players
San Francisco Seals (baseball) players
Dallas Giants players
Galveston Pirates players
Chattanooga Lookouts players
Waco Navigators players
Little Rock Travelers players
Atlanta Crackers players
New Orleans Pelicans (baseball) players
Birmingham Barons players
Knoxville Smokies players
People from Marshall County, Mississippi